Jean-Michel Basquiat: The Radiant Child is a 2010 documentary film directed by Tamra Davis. It crosscuts excerpts from Davis' on-camera interview with the artist Jean-Michel Basquiat and anecdotes from his friends and associates. The film was shown at the Sundance Film Festival in 2010.

Background 
Tamra Davis was working in a Los Angeles art gallery in 1986 when she filmed an interview with her friend, Jean-Michel Basquiat. After Basquiat's death from a heroin overdose in 1988, Davis stored the footage away. In 2008, Davis was encouraged by gallerists at the Museum of Contemporary Art to do something with the footage. She began interviewing friends and associates of Basquiat's and pieced together a documentary. The film is titled after an article about Basquiat written by art critic Rene Ricard for Artforum in 1981.

Synopsis 
In the beginning of his 10-year career, Jean-Michel Basquiat was known for his graffiti art under the alias SAMO in Manhattan's Lower East Side in the late 1970s. He sold his first painting to Debbie Harry for $200, dated Madonna, and became a close friend and collaborator of Andy Warhol's. Basquiat was launched into international stardom for his bebop-influenced neoexpressionist work. However, soon his cult status began to overshadow his art. As a successful black artist, Basquiat was constantly confronted by racism and misconceptions. The Radiant Child draws from insider interviews and archival footage of Basquiat's telling his story in his own words.

People interviewed
Julian Schnabel
Larry Gagosian
Bruno Bischofberger
Tony Shafrazi
Fab Five Freddy
Deitch Projects
Glenn O'Brien
Maripol
Thurston Moore
Nelson George
Kai Eric
Nicholas Taylor
Fred Hoffmann
Michael Holman
Diego Cortez
Annina Nosei
Suzanne Mallouk
Rene Ricard
Kenny Scharf
Robert Farris Thompson
Kelle Inman

Reviews 
The film received positive reviews, however, critics noted that it doesn’t fully explore why Basquiat's work was so "innovative in the New York art scene of the 1980s." Slant Magazine wrote that "you see the paintings and hear people praise them, without the space to consider them in between, " adding: "The film's a decent introduction to a man who walked the world of SoHo, CBGB, and Andy Warhol's final days, but the more you know going into the movie, the more you sense it leaving out."

The Hollywood Reporter wrote: "Naturally, the doc is well illustrated with examples of Basquiat’s work, some of which are little-seen. But even those who dispute his place in art history should come away with a feeling for the man whose brief career is a textbook example of a flame burning too bright to last."

The Artforum wrote: "The movie gives a sense of how driven he was, how it seemed as if he aimed, by sheer volume, to assure himself a place in the pantheon of twentieth-century painters, when in fact he achieved that position by virtue of a necessarily smaller number of masterpieces, produced in the early and late stages of his heartbreakingly short career."

References

External links
 
 
 
 
 Jean-Michel Basquiat: The Radiant Child site for Independent Lens on PBS

2010 films
American documentary films
Documentary films about painters
Films directed by Tamra Davis
2010 documentary films
Jean-Michel Basquiat
2010s English-language films
2010s American films